ABNA may refer to any of the following:
Abna', a group of Persians in early Islamic Yemen
 AhlulBayt News Agency (ABNA), Iran
 Amazon Breakthrough Novel Award
 Australasian Biospecimen Network Association